Neith was an ancient Egyptian queen consort, one of the principal queens of the Old Kingdom pharaoh Pepi II Neferkare, who ruled (c. 2278 BC – c. 2184 BC). Queen Neith was named after goddess Neith.

Family
Neith is thought to have been a daughter of the pharaoh Pepi I and queen Ankhesenpepi I, making her aunt and cousin to pharaoh Pepi II. Neith may be the mother of King Nemtyemsaf II. There is a legend about Queen Nitocris who, if she indeed existed at all, may have been a daughter of Neith.

Titles
Her titles as a royal daughter include: King’s Daughter (zȝt-nswt), Eldest King’s Daughter of his body (zȝt-nswt-smswt-n-ẖt.f), Eldest King’s Daughter of his body of Mennefer-Meryre (zȝt-nswt-smswt-n-ẖt.f-mn-nfr-mry-rˁ), and Hereditary Princess (jryt-pˁt),

As a wife of the pharaoh she used the titles: King’s Wife (hmt-nisw), Beloved King’s Wife of Men-ankh-Neferkare (ḥmt-nsw mryt.f-mn-ˁnḫ-nfr-kȝ-rˁ), Great of Praises (wrt-ḥzwt), Great one of the hetes-sceptre (wrt-hetes), She who sees Horus and Seth (mȝȝt-ḥrw-stẖ),  Attendant of Horus (ḫt-ḥrw), Consort and beloved of the Two Ladies (smȝyt-mry-nbty), Companion of Horus (tjst-ḥrw), and Companion of Horus (smrt-ḥrw)

Neith's title King’s Mother (mwt-nswt) shows that she was the  mother of a pharaoh.

Burial

Of the three small pyramid complexes built around that of the chief pyramid of Pepi II, Neith's is the largest.
Neith's pyramid may have been the first one constructed among the queen's pyramids associated with Pepi II. Neith's pyramid complex included a small temple, a satellite pyramid and a fleet of sixteen wooden boats buried between the main and satellite pyramid. The entrance to the enclosure was flanked by two inscribed obelisks. Neith's burial chamber was inscribed with Pyramid Texts. This is the second known occurrence of these texts in a queen's pyramid, the first being those of Ankhenespepy II. The burial chamber contained a red granite sarcophagus (empty) and a canopic chest.

The remains of at least part of her mummy were uncovered and were once housed in the Qasr el-Aini Medical School.

Sources

Queens consort of the Sixth Dynasty of Egypt
23rd-century BC women
22nd-century BC women
Pepi II Neferkare
Pepi I Meryre